The 2013 Codasur South American Rally Championship season was an international rally championship sanctioned by the FIA and run by the Confederacion Deportiva Automovilismo Sudamericana (Codasur). The championship is contested over four events held in four countries across South America, running from May to November. The championship was won by Paraguayan driver Gustavo Saba driving a Škoda Fabia. It was Saba's third consecutive title and he became the first three-time champion.

2013 saw a reduced calendar with Argentine event Rally de Misiones Posadas removed from the calendar and a much later start to the season with the Rally de Erechim in Brazil in May.

Reigning champion Gustavo Saba won all four events in his new car, a Super 2000 specification Škoda Fabia which replaced his Group N Mitsubishi Lancer. Mitsubishi Lancer driver Eduardo Peredo finished second in both the Rally de Santa Cruz and Rally de Minas while Ford Fiesta driver Miguel Zaldivar was second in both the Rally de Erechim and the Rally Transitapua. Peredo finished runner up in the championship ahead of Zalvidar on the basis of their other results.

Race calendar and results

The 2013 Codasur South American Rally Championship is as follows:

Championship standings
The 2013 Codasur South American Rally Championship points are as follows:

References

External links
Official website

Codasur South American Rally Championship
Codasur South America
Codasur South American Rally Championship